Gates is a town in Lauderdale County, Tennessee. The population was 901 at the 2000 census and 647 at the 2010 census showing a decline of 254.

History

Gates was established around 1850 and named for Revolutionary War general Horatio Gates.  The town was incorporated in 1886.

Geography
Gates is located at  (35.839253, -89.407058). The town is concentrated around the intersection of State Route 88 and State Route 209 south of Halls and northeast of Ripley.

Gates is situated on the southeastern edge of the New Madrid Seismic Zone, an area with a high earthquake risk.

Demographics

2020 census

As of the 2020 United States census, there were 664 people, 276 households, and 162 families residing in the town.

2000 census
As of the census of 2000, there were 901 people, 266 households, and 201 families residing in the town. The population density was 1,272.5 people per square mile (490.0/km2). There were 290 housing units at an average density of 409.6 per square mile (157.7/km2). The racial makeup of the town was 45.95% White, 53.39% African American, 0.11% Native American, and 0.55% from two or more races. Hispanic or Latino of any race were 0.22% of the population.

There were 266 households, out of which 41.0% had children under the age of 18 living with them, 38.3% were married couples living together, 31.6% had a female householder with no husband present, and 24.1% were non-families. 21.4% of all households were made up of individuals, and 9.4% had someone living alone who was 65 years of age or older. The average household size was 2.79 and the average family size was 3.20.

In the town, the population was spread out, with 28.6% under the age of 18, 7.3% from 18 to 24, 22.9% from 25 to 44, 17.1% from 45 to 64, and 24.1% who were 65 years of age or older. The median age was 37 years. For every 100 females, there were 69.0 males. For every 100 females age 18 and over, there were 58.0 males.

The median income for a household in the town was $29,191, and the median income for a family was $29,653. Males had a median income of $24,615 versus $22,750 for females. The per capita income for the town was $9,910. About 26.3% of families and 26.5% of the population were below the poverty line, including 30.8% of those under age 18 and 40.6% of those age 65 or over.

Notable people
 George Taliaferro - Former professional American football player

References

External links

Towns in Tennessee
Towns in Lauderdale County, Tennessee
Majority-minority cities and towns in Tennessee